Norman Richard "Norm" Foster (born February 10, 1965) is a Canadian former professional ice hockey goaltender who played 13 games in the National Hockey League (NHL) for the Boston Bruins and Edmonton Oilers between 1990 and 1992.

As a youth, he played in the 1978 Quebec International Pee-Wee Hockey Tournament with a minor ice hockey team from the Fraser Valley.

He currently resides in Rochester, Michigan.

Career statistics

Regular season and playoffs

International

Awards and honours

References

External links
 

1965 births
Living people
Boston Bruins draft picks
Boston Bruins players
Canadian ice hockey goaltenders
Cape Breton Oilers players
Detroit Falcons (CoHL) players
Detroit Vipers players
Edmonton Oilers players
Hershey Bears players
Kansas City Blades players
Las Vegas Thunder players
Maine Mariners players
Michigan State Spartans men's ice hockey players
Milwaukee Admirals (IHL) players
NCAA men's ice hockey national champions
Penticton Knights players
Ice hockey people from Vancouver